The 2004 Edmonton municipal election was held on October 18, 2004 to elect a mayor and twelve councillors to sit on Edmonton City Council, nine trustees to sit on the public school board, and seven trustees to sit on the separate school board.

Voter turnout
There were 212,105 ballots cast out of 507,577 eligible voters, for a voter turnout of 41.8%.

Results
(bold indicates elected, italics indicate incumbent)

Mayor

Councillors

Twelve councillors, two elected in each of six wards, with voters having up to two votes each.

Five women, seven men were elected as city councillors.

Public school trustees

Separate (Catholic) school trustees
One trustee is elected from each ward, and the non-victorious candidate with the most total votes is also elected.

References
 City of Edmonton: Edmonton Elections

2004
2004 Alberta municipal elections